Shing is a village and jamoat in western Tajikistan. It is part of the city of Panjakent in Sughd Region. The jamoat has a total population of 10,873 (2015). It consists of 16 villages, including Shing (the seat), Gizhdarva, Vagashton and Zamchorroha.

References

Populated places in Sughd Region
Jamoats of Tajikistan